= Masonry arch =

A masonry arch may refer to:

- Triumphal arch, an architectural monument containing an arch, built from any variety of stone
- Arch bridge, a bridge constructed of masonry for pedestrian and / or vehicular traffic
